SS Argentina may refer to:

 , launched in 1929 as SS Pennsylvania, renamed Argentina in 1938
 , launched in 1958 and renamed numerous times

Ship names